The Taifa of Orihuela was a medieval taifa Moorish kingdom. It existed probably from around 1239 to 1249.

List of Emirs

Islamic dynasty
Abu Dja'far: fl. 13th century
Abu'l-Hasam: died 1249/50

1249 disestablishments in Europe
States and territories established in 1239
Orihuela